Christ Church is a protestant church in Kotri District of Hyderabad in the province of Sindh in Pakistan. The church is the first and the oldest churches in Pakistan with zero reconstruction.

It attends to a congregational strength of approximately 200 people and is located in the town of Kotri. The church is administered by the Diocese of Hyderabad, Church of Pakistan.

History
It was built in 1846, entirely of stones.

References

Churches in Pakistan
1846 establishments in British India